William Edwin Franklin (born May 3, 1930) is an American prelate of the Roman Catholic Church, He served as an auxiliary bishop of Archdiocese of Dubuque in Iowa from 1987 to 1993, and as bishop of the Diocese of Davenport, also in Iowa, from 1993 to 2006.

Biography

Early life 
Franklin was born on May 3, 1930, in Parnell, Iowa, the son of John and Matilda (Milholin) Franklin. He was educated in the local parochial school and at the former St. Patrick High School in Cedar Rapids, Iowa. He graduated from Loras College in Dubuque, and studied for the priesthood at Mount St. Bernard's Seminary in Dubuque.

Priesthood 
Franklin was ordained a priest for the Archdiocese of Dubuque on February 4, 1956, by Archbishop Leo Binz in St. Raphael's Cathedral in Dubuque.  His initial assignment after ordination was as secretary to Archbishop Emeritus Henry Rohlman before being named associate pastor of St. John's Parish in Independence, Iowa. From 1959 to 1974, Franklin was a faculty member at Wahlert High School in Dubuque. From 1974 to 1976 he served as associate pastor of St. Mary's Parish and a member of the faculty of Columbus High School, both in Waterloo, Iowa. Franklin served as the pastor of St. Francis of Assisi Parish in Fayette, Iowa and St. Francis Xavier Parish in Hawkeye, Iowa from 1976 to 1980. Franklin became pastor in 1980 of Immaculate Conception Parish in Gilbertville, Iowa before becoming pastor of St. Edward Parish in Waterloo. In 1984, he was assigned as dean of the Waterloo Deanery.

Auxiliary Bishop of Dubuque 
On January 29, 1987, Franklin was named titular bishop of Surista and as an auxiliary bishop of the Archdiocese of Dubuque by Pope John Paul II. He was consecrated a bishop by Archbishop Daniel Kucera on April 1, 1987, in St. Raphael's Cathedral. Archbishop Emeritus James Byrne and Auxiliary Bishop Francis Dunn acted as principal co-consecrators. Franklin was assigned to be the episcopal vicar of the Waterloo Region of the archdiocese. His office was in St. Joseph Rectory in Waterloo.

Bishop of Davenport
On November 12, 1993, John Paul II named Franklin as the seventh bishop of the Diocese of Davenport. He was installed January 20, 1994, by Archbishop Kucera in Sacred Heart Cathedral in the presence of the apostolic nuncio to the United States, Archbishop Agostino Cacciavillan.

Franklin revised the diocesan staff, creating an Office of Pastoral Services that combined the ministries of liturgy, education, and social action into the same office to facilitate better communication. He initially did away with the Diocesan Pastoral Council and instituted a Diocesan Pastoral Council Convocation in its place. The convocation drew together clergy, religious orders, and parishioners for their input and formation. Franklin also restructured the deaneries to include Deanery Councils, again to better facilitate communication between the diocese and its parishioners.

Several parishes in the diocese either merged or closed because of changing demographics. The Redemptorists, who had served St. Alphonsus parish in Davenport for 89 years as well as in other parishes, left the diocese in 1997 because of declining numbers. The Sisters of St. Francis in Clinton built a new motherhouse in Clinton, Iowa called the Canticle, also in 1997. Irene Prior Loftus was the first layperson to serve as the diocesan chancellor, and Mary Weiser was hired as the first layperson to serve the diocese as superintendent of schools.

In 2000, the diocese celebrated the Jubilee Year proclaimed by John Paul II. There were no diocesan celebrations, rather they were planned and celebrated in the diocese's six deaneries. The following year, the pope bestowed papal honors on 26 people of the diocese nominated by Franklin. Four priests were named by the Vatican as chaplains to his holiness, eight laymen were honored as knights of St. Gregory the Great, three women received the honor of dames of the Order of St. Gregory the Great, and 11 men and women received the cross oro ecclesia et pontifice. The three women bestowed with the Order of St. Gregory were the first such recipients in the history of the diocese.
 
The diocese lost two of its colleges just after the turn of the 21st century. Marycrest International University in Davenport, which began as a woman's college in the 1930s, closed its doors in 2002. Mt. St. Clair College in Clinton, Iowa, expanded and became The Franciscan University in 2002 and then the Franciscan University of the Prairies two years later. In 2005, it was sold to Bridgepoint Education, Inc. and became Ashford University, ending its affiliation with the Catholic Church.

In 2002, Franklin received allegations of sexual abuse of minors in the 1970's by William Wiebler, a diocese priest.  After Wiebler confessed his crimes to Franklin, the bishop ordered him to enter the Vianney Renewal Center, a treatment facility for priests in Dittmer, Missouri.  However, Wiebler later checked out of the facility and moved into a private residence in University City, Missouri, outside the diocese.  In 2004, the diocese settled the claims of 37 sexual abuse victims for $9 million dollars; one of the priests named in the settlement was Wiebler.  He was laicized in January 2006, several months before his death. 

In 2006, the diocese celebrated its 125th anniversary. A eucharistic congress was held to mark the occasion at the LeClaire Park Bandshell. Bishop Paul Coakly preached the homily at the concluding mass. On October 10, 2006, the diocese filed for Chapter 11 bankruptcy protection.  According to Franklin, this was to properly managed the settlement of sexual abuse lawsuits facing the diocese.

Retirement and legacy 
On October 12, 2006, Pope Benedict XVI accepted Franklin's letter of resignation as Bishop of Davenport. Franklin Hall, a residence hall at St. Ambrose University in Davenport, Iowa is named in his honor.

See also
 Historical list of the Catholic bishops of the United States
 List of Catholic bishops of the United States

References

1930 births
Living people
20th-century Roman Catholic bishops in the United States
21st-century Roman Catholic bishops in the United States
Loras College alumni
Roman Catholic Archdiocese of Dubuque
Roman Catholic bishops of Davenport
People from Iowa County, Iowa
American Roman Catholic clergy of Irish descent
People from Waterloo, Iowa